Baron Sysonby, of Wonersh in the County of Surrey, was a title in the Peerage of the United Kingdom. It was created in 1935 for the soldier and courtier Sir Frederick Ponsonby. He was the second son of Sir Henry Ponsonby, grandson of Frederick Ponsonby, 3rd Earl of Bessborough, while Arthur Ponsonby, 1st Baron Ponsonby of Shulbrede, was his younger brother. The barony became extinct on the death of his grandson, the third Baron, in 2009.

Barons Sysonby (1935)
Frederick Edward Grey Ponsonby, 1st Baron Sysonby (1867–1935)
Edward Gaspard Ponsonby, 2nd Baron Sysonby (1903–1956)
John Frederick Ponsonby, 3rd Baron Sysonby (1945–2009)

See also
Earl of Bessborough
Baron Ponsonby of Imokilly
Baron de Mauley
Baron Ponsonby of Shulbrede

References 

 Kidd, Charles, Williamson, David (editors). Debrett's Peerage and Baronetage (1990 edition). New York: St Martin's Press, 1990,

External links

Extinct baronies in the Peerage of the United Kingdom
Ponsonby family
Noble titles created in 1935